The Dunstane is a boutique hotel located in the west of Edinburgh on West Coates.

History

Dunstane Villa

The building was originally designed by Edinburgh architect Alexander Black and was built as a private home on what was then the edge of the city, in 1852. The Dunstane was home to the distiller Ross family, who gave their name to the Ross Bandstand in Princes Street Gardens.

The building was also used as a training school by Royal Bank of Scotland. It is protected as a category B listed building.

The Dunstane began operating as a hotel in 1969. It was bought by current owners, Derek and Shirley Mowat, in 1998.

Hampton House at Dunstane Houses
Around 1867, an Edinburgh music seller, Archibald Shearer, then living in the Dunstane, was granted permission to "erect a house or villa agreeable to the plan approved of by the Feoffers of Trust and Governors of George Heriot's Hospital". The link between the properties was restored when it was bought by the Mowats in 2007. The building was opened in 2008 as the 18-bedroom Dunstane City Hotel, by former Scotland rugby union international Scott Hastings.

References

External links
 The Dunstane official website

Hotels in Edinburgh
Hotels established in 1969
Hotels established in 2008
Category B listed buildings in Edinburgh
Listed hotels in Scotland
1969 establishments in Scotland